The 1954 AAA Championship Car season consisted of 13 races, beginning in Speedway, Indiana on May 30 and concluding in Las Vegas, Nevada on November 14.  There was also one non-championship event in Mechanicsburg, Pennsylvania.  The AAA National Champion was Jimmy Bryan, and the Indianapolis 500 winner was Bill Vukovich. Bob Scott was killed in the Independence Day Sweepstakes race at Darlington.

Schedule and results

 Indianapolis 500 was USAC-sanctioned and counted towards the 1954 World Championship of Drivers title.
 No pole is awarded for the Pikes Peak Hill Climb, in this schedule on the pole is the driver who started first. No lap led was awarded for the Pikes Peak Hill Climb, however, a lap was awarded to the drivers that completed the climb.
 Final 65 laps completed on November 8 due to heavy dust and the rough condition of the track

Final points standings

Note: The points became the car, when not only one driver led the car, the relieved driver became small part of the points. Points for driver method: (the points for the finish place) / (number the lap when completed the car) * (number the lap when completed the driver)

References

General references
 
 
 
 http://media.indycar.com/pdf/2011/IICS_2011_Historical_Record_Book_INT6.pdf  (p. 287-290)

See also
 1954 Indianapolis 500

AAA Championship Car season
AAA Championship Car
1954 in American motorsport
1954 in sports in Nevada